Jones High School is located in the Parramore/Lorna Doone neighborhood in the urban heart of Orlando, Florida at 801 S. Rio Grande Avenue. It is a public school in the Orange County School District. The school mascot is the Tiger and the colors are orange and green.

In May 2008, Newsweek named Jones to its annual America's Top Public High Schools list.

History

The first public school for African Americans in Orlando was formed in 1895 and housed in a building on the corner of Garland Avenue and Church Street. The school was renamed Johnson Academy for principal Lymus Johnson and moved to a new building on the corner of Parramore Avenue and Jefferson Street. In 1921, a brick Colonial Revival building was constructed on the corner of Parramore Avenue and Washington Street at a cost of $34,000. In 1931 the school's first 12th grade class graduated.

The school was renamed for the final time in honor of L. C. Jones, a longtime school principal and donor of the property.

It was a member of the Florida Interscholastic Athletic Association.

In 1952, the school moved west of downtown to its current location on Rio Grande Avenue. In 1988, as part of a schoolwide project, Jones entered the Guinness Book of World Records for creating the World's Largest Box of Popcorn. Aided by a propane-powered air popper designed by engineering students from the University of Central Florida, Jones students popped  of popcorn. Orville Redenbacher, whose company donated the unpopped corn, mentioned the feat during a broadcast of the now-defunct Pat Sajak Show.

A new campus consisting of a two-story academic building, separate buildings for science, technology, and music, an administrative building, cafeteria, gymnasium, media center, and dedicated historical museum was constructed during the period 2001–2004. During construction, students attended classes in portables across the street from the campus. The new campus was opened for the start of the 2004–2005 school year.

Academics
Jones High School is an International Baccalaureate World School, offering the Diploma Programme for juniors and seniors and the Middle Years Programme for freshmen and sophomores in articulation with Memorial Middle School.

Jones High students may also enroll in its Medical Arts Magnet Program or in an advanced studies program of multiple Advanced Placement (AP) courses. AP Courses offered include Art History, Biology, Calculus (AB), Chemistry, English Language and Composition, English Literature and Composition, European History, French Language, Human Geography, Music Theory, Macroeconomics, Microeconomics, Psychology, Spanish Language, Statistics, Studio Art, United States Government and Politics, United States History, and World History.

Selected students who show academic promise who are also among the first in their families to go to college are invited to participate in the Advancement Via Individual Determination (AVID) Program.

Extracurriculars
The Marching Tiger Band is well known throughout the Central Florida area. They marched in the 1976 United States Bicentennial Parade in Washington, DC, 2003 Macy's Thanksgiving Day Parade, prior to Macy's they also marched at the 2002 Boscov's Thanksgiving Day Parade in Philadelphia. The band also performed at WrestleMania XXIV, playing John Cena's entrance theme music "The Time Is Now". In 2018 the Wind ensemble and the choir went to New York and performed at Carnegie Hall and received a standing ovation there told that they were welcomed back at any time.

Athletics
Jones High's varsity sports teams include  baseball, basketball, bowling, cross country, flag football (girls), football, golf, soccer, softball, track and field, volleyball, wrestling, and weightlifting.

The Jones High boys basketball team won the Florida 3A state championship in 2006 under Coach Jerry Howard. The girls basketball team has won two Florida state championships, in 2004 under Coach Jimmy Mincy, and in 1997 under Coach Kelvin Harris.

Notable alumni
David L. Brewer III, former Superintendent, Los Angeles Unified School District
Ernie Calloway, NFL player
Jerry Demings, Mayor, Orange County; Former Chief Of Police; City Of Orlando, Former Sheriff; Orange County, 
Yusuf Estes, former National Muslim Chaplain for the United States Bureau of Prisons
Sylvester James Gates, PhD, noted theoretical physicist
Jaye Howard, football player
Benny Johnson, NFL player
Kevin Lewis, former New York Giants linebacker
Bernard Morris, former Marshall University quarterback
Nate Newton, former pro football player
Tim Newton, former pro football player
Ernest Page, former mayor of Orlando
Belvin Perry, Chief Judge, Ninth Judicial Circuit Court of Florida (Orange/Osceola)
Eric Powell
Vince Sanders, Chicago radio personality; former V.P. National Black Network; co-founder NABJ
Wesley Snipes, film actor
Max Starks, former pro football player
Jarvis Williams, football player
Shavonte Zellous, 2009 WNBA All-Rookie Team, Detroit Shock

See also
List of high schools in Florida
Orange County Public Schools

Sources
http://www.greatschools.net/modperl/browse_school/fl/2096
https://web.archive.org/web/20081201142545/http://www.cfhf.net/orlando/1921.htm

External links
FCAT Failure
10th Grade FCAT Reading
Effort to Reform
Marching Tiger Band Website
School Website
Jones High School Alumni Social Network donated by Grace Jordan.com

Notes

Orange County Public Schools
High schools in Orange County, Florida
Schools in Orlando, Florida
Public high schools in Florida
Historically segregated African-American schools in Florida
1895 establishments in Florida
Educational institutions established in 1895